Thundercrack! is a 1975 pornographic black comedy horror film written, edited, shot and directed by Curt McDowell, and written by George Kuchar based on a story by McDowell and Mark Ellinger. It stars Marion Eaton, Ken Scudder, Melinda McDowell and George Kuchar. Combining an "old dark house" mystery with hardcore sex scenes, Thundercrack! is more recently regarded as a cult film. It bears the influences of Jack Smith’s lush, DIY, camp aesthetic, and Nan Goldin’s glimpses of countercultural bohemia.

Plot
The story begins during a thunderstorm. The house, which is shown in the opening shot, named Prairie Blossom, is very clearly fake which lends itself to comedic value. A caller, Willene Cassidy (Maggie Pyle), pays a visit to the house owner, Mrs. Gert Hammond (Marion Eaton), who is very drunk. She insists that she make herself presentable before she answers the door.  This takes a very long time and she makes a bad job of putting on her makeup. In an effort to get the alcohol out of her system she makes herself vomit by putting her fingers down her throat. Finally, having retrieved her wig from the toilet, where it fell during her vomiting, she is ready to greet her visitor. Willene is shocked at the dishevelled appearance of Mrs. Hammond and insist on giving her a bath. Willene explains that her husband is a very famous yet untalented country music star, Simon Cassidy, whose music is heard on the radio during the later scene. During the course of the bath, Willene unintentionally masturbates Mrs. Hammond. It is also revealed that Mr. Hammond died and that their son "no longer exists".

As the night goes on, more and more visitors appear to shelter from the storm. Among them is Chandler (Mookie Blodgett), widower of the incredibly wealthy Sarah Lou Phillips, whose family owns the largest girdle factory in the United States. Their popularity is such that few American women are without one. Chandler relates the story of his wife's death. She burned to death at a cocktail party, where there was a freak accident and her girdle caught fire. This caused burning rubber to envelop her head, and finally she fell dead into the swimming pool, her head steaming. This causes Chandler to have a bizarre sexual dysfunction. Although initially attracted to women, they would invariably prove to be owners of House of Phillips girdles. When they took off their clothes before sex, he would be reminded of the death of his wife and would not be able to maintain an erection. For this reason he had been having sex with other men, as they don't wear girdles that would remind him of Sarah Lou's horrific immolation. Rather strangely, during the telling of this story, Chandler is being fellated by Sash (Melinda McDowell) and has no apparent erectile problems. The two, while in the basement, discover that Mrs. Hammond had pickled the remains of her husband and kept them in a jar. She tells of the death of her husband, who had been working one day in the grain bin and got covered with grain dust. A swarm of locusts dived on him to eat the dust and in the process devoured much of Mr. Hammond's body.

During the course of the night, many of the guests have sex with each other in various combinations. There are a great many sex toys at Prairie Blossom. Mrs. Hammond explains that her son collected them. They would be delivered in plain brown packages which she would take to him with his morning breakfast. This causes her to wistfully repeat that he "no longer exists". One of the guests, a man named Toydy, becomes obsessed with finding the key to a locked door in the house. One of the female guests, Roo (Moira Benson), finds the key but will not give it to Toydy (Rick Johnson) unless he agrees to ejaculate in her mouth. Despite not finding her attractive, Toydy agrees and manages to stay aroused by watching Bond (Ken Scudder) and Willene have sex.

The final human guest at Prairie Blossom, Bing (George Kuchar), arrives in an agitated state. He had come from the circus in a vehicle containing a toothless lion, a near-blind elephant, and a female gorilla named Medusa. He explains to the group that Medusa is extremely dangerous and is likely to kill anyone she comes across. It is revealed that Bing himself is the cause of the apes murderous tendencies. His circus-mates, having got Bing drunk, convinced him to have sex with a prostitute. Despite her being hirsute, Bing is too drunk to decline. The next morning, he awakens to the pleasant feeling of being masturbated, though to his horror, the act is being carried out by Medusa, who now has a severe crush on him. She soon realises that her feelings are not being reciprocated and becomes enraged with him, and indeed all men. However, subsequent mistreatment by a female circus-worker causes these feelings to spread to women as well. The only way to calm Medusa is by giving her bananas.

Toydy, having watched Bond and Willene have sex, decides to lie to Bond in order to have sex with him. Toydy says that he has a crate of bananas and will give them to Bond if he will have sex with him. Bond considers this carefully, not having had a homosexual encounter before, but agrees on the strength that he and Willene (who has by now forgotten about her husband) can use the bananas to escape the murderous primate. On discovering the deception, Bond takes it in his stride and tells Willene he had to be broken in sometime. He jokes that if things don't work out between himself and her, he can always try for her husband.

Meanwhile, Toydy having gained the key to the locked door earlier opens it with Roo to discover Prairie Blossom's terrible secret. By morning, the fate of Roo and Toydy is unknown to the others. Chandler and Sash leave together, as do Bond and Willene, though Bond tells her he likes to sleep around too much to really settle down. Bing has married Medusa, though for some reason, he wore the wedding dress. Mrs. Hammond, alone with the jar containing her husband, proposes a toast to love, and pours Mr. Hammond's drink into his jar.

Cast

 Marion Eaton as Mrs. Gert Hammond
 Ken Scudder as Bond
 Melinda McDowell as Sash
 George Kuchar as Bing
 Mookie Blodgett as Chandler
 Bernie Boyle as Señor Tostada
 Mark Ellinger as Charlie Hammond
 Maggie Pyle as Willene Cassidy
 Laurie Hendricks as Mrs. Cassidy
 Moira Benson as Roo
 Rick Johnson as Toydy
 Virginia Giritlian as Sarah Lou Phillips
 Billy Paradise as Mrs. Harlan
 Pamela Primate as Medusa
 John Thomas as Simon Cassidy
 Margo O'Connor
 Roy Ramsing
 Gael Sikula

Release

Because of its graphic sex including masturbation, heterosexual and homosexual couplings, the film is unavailable in many areas of the world. However, the film is available on DVD in parts of Europe. Synapse Films was working closely with the director's sister and Thundercrack! actress, Melinda McDowell for a 35th anniversary DVD edition originally due to be released in 2010. In a film fan blog published June 7, 2013, the owners of Synapse Films say they are still working on an upcoming release of the film. The Synapse Blu-Ray/DVD was released in 2015 for the film's 40th anniversary.

On December 11, 2015, for the film's fortieth anniversary, Thundercrack! screened at the Castro Theatre in San Francisco, California in an event hosted by drag queen Peaches Christ.

Reception
The film is unusual for its time as it is shot in black-and-white and features graphic sexual acts. In terms of its intentional tastelessness, it could be compared to the films of John Waters.

Home media
The Dutch Shock DVD is available semi-officially (the company were also responsible for its limited release in the 90s on VHS) - however the DVD is struck from the same master as the VHS and the image is poorly transferred. Also the frequent scratches are on the 16mm source print - they are not there to purposefully age the film. The film was edited down from 153 mins by its  backers The Thomas Brothers in the hope of making it more marketable.

A new DVD and Blu-ray version was released on December 8, 2015 from cult distributor Synapse Films. This release will feature a high-definition transfer of the film in its original filmed aspect ratio of 1.33:1. The Blu-ray includes such special features as rare interview footage of director McDowell presented in the form of an audio commentary, a behind-the-scenes documentary titled It Came from Kuchar, a documentary about George and Mike Kuchar, and a bonus DVD including interviews, audition footage, short films, and outtakes.

See also
 List of American films of 1975

References

External links
 
 

1975 films
1975 horror films
1970s black comedy films
1970s comedy horror films
1975 LGBT-related films
1970s pornographic films
American black comedy films
American comedy horror films
American independent films
American LGBT-related films
American pornographic films
Bisexual pornographic films
Bisexuality-related films
American black-and-white films
Films shot in San Francisco
Lesbian pornographic films
Lesbian-related films
LGBT-related horror films
Pornographic horror films
1975 comedy films
1975 drama films
1970s English-language films
1970s American films